Branwen Gwyn is a Welsh television presenter from Cardiff.

Early life and education 
Branwen was born in Bangor, Gwynedd and is the daughter of Welsh actor Gwyn Parry. She attended Ysgol Gyfun Gymraeg Glantaf and the University of Wales, Bangor, where she studied music - she is a pianist, trumpeter and singer.

Career 
Since graduating in 1999 she has presented various programmes for S4C, including their flagship children's programme Planed Plant and presenter of magazine-style evening programme, Wedi 7.

References

Welsh television presenters
Welsh women television presenters
Mass media people from Cardiff
Living people
Year of birth missing (living people)
People educated at Ysgol Gyfun Gymraeg Glantaf
Alumni of the University of Wales